According to the Islamic doctrine, Zakariyā (Zechariah) is a prophet and messenger of God (Allah), and a father of the prophet Yahya.

In the Quran 
Zakariya was a righteous priest and prophet of God whose office was in the Second Temple in Jerusalem. He would frequently be in charge of managing the services of the temple and he would always remain steadfast in prayer to God.

Praying for a son 
As he reached his old age, Zakariya began to worry over who would continue the legacy of preaching the message of God after his death and who would carry on the daily services of the temple after him. Zakariya started to pray to God for a son. The praying for the birth of an offspring was not merely out of the desire for a child. He prayed both for himself and for the public – they needed a messenger, a man of God who would work in the service of the Lord after Zakariya. Zakariya had character and virtue and he wanted to transfer this to his spiritual heir as his most precious possession. His dream was to restore the household to the posterity of the Patriarch Jacob, and to make sure the message of God was renewed for Israel. As the Qur'an recounts:

Fathering Yahya 
As a gift from God, Zakariya  was given a son named Yaḥyá (a name specially chosen for this child alone. Muslim tradition narrates that Zakariya was ninety-two years old when he was told of John's birth.

In accordance with Zakariya's prayer, God made John (Yahya) renew the message of God, which had been corrupted and lost by the Israelites. As the Qur'an says:

Guardian of Maryam 
According to the Qur'an, Zakariya was the guardian of Maryam . The Qur'an states:

Muslim theology maintains that Zakariya, along with John the Baptist and Jesus, ushered in a new era of prophets – all of whom came from the priestly descent of Amram (Imran), the father of the prophet Aaron. The fact that, of all the priests, it was Zakariya who was given the duty of keeping care of Mary (Maryam) shows his status as a pious man. Zakariya  is frequently praised in the Qur'an as a prophet of God and righteous man. One such appraisal is in sura al-An'am:

After his son Yahya (AS) had been decapitated by the Children of Israel, Zakariya tried to escape from them. Some historians say that as a miracle a tree opened for Zakariya (AS) to hide in but accidentally a small part of clothing stuck out. Shaytan (Satan) saw this and took it to his advantage. He took on the form of a human and told the Children of Israel where Zakariya (AS) was hiding. For this, the soldiers then cut down the tree, killing Zakariya painfully. Some people say he was 130 years old when he died.

References 

Hebrew Bible prophets of the Quran